Gʻuzor is a city in Qashqadaryo Region of Uzbekistan. It serves as the administrative center of Gʻuzor District. Its population is 24,500 (2016).

The town is home to a Polish War cemetery, one of many along the route that General Anders' army took during the Second World War.

Population

History 
Guzar was one of the most important cities of the Bukhara Khanate. The status of the city was assigned in 1977 (before that - a village). There is a Polish military cemetery in Huzar.

Geography 
Located southeast of Karshi on the river Gʻuzordaryo, a tributary of the Kashkadarya. There is a railway station of the same name in the city - a junction of railroads to Karshi, Kitob and Kumkurgan.

Sports 
The football club "Shurtan" is based in Guzar, and in 2005-2013 and 2015-2017 played in the Uzbekistan Major League.

Economy 
Processing of agricultural raw materials, construction company, chemical and agrochemical enterprises. Light industry enterprises are located in the city.

Social objects 
A new sports complex with a modern football arena. Cemetery-memorial to Polish prisoners of war who were in Uzbekistan in the 1940s

References

Populated places in Qashqadaryo Region
Cities in Uzbekistan